Narbethong was a rural locality in the Barcaldine Region, Queensland, Australia.

On 22 November 2019 the Queensland Government decided to amalgamate the localities in the Barcaldine Region, resulting in five expanded localities based on the larger towns: Alpha, Aramac, Barcaldine, Jericho and Muttaburra. Most of Narbethong was incorporated into Barcaldine, except for the north-eastern corner which was incorporated into Jericho.

Geography 
The Landsborough Highway forms the western boundary of the locality. Narbethong Road commences at the highway and passes west to east through the locality.

The principal land use is grazing on native vegetation.

Education 
There are no schools in Narbethong. The nearest primary schools are in Barcaldine, Jericho, and Blackall. The nearest secondary schools are in Barcaldine and Blackall.

References 

Barcaldine Region
Unbounded localities in Queensland